Robert Gordon Wilson (16 April 1938 – 25 June 2017) was a Scottish politician and solicitor. He was the leader of the Scottish National Party (SNP) from 1979 to 1990, and was SNP Member of Parliament (MP) for Dundee East from 1974 to 1987. He was Rector of the University of Dundee from 1983 to 1986.

Background
Wilson was born in Govan, Glasgow, the son of Elizabeth Murray and Robert George Wilson, a butcher's van driver. He was educated at Douglas High School for Boys on the Isle of Man, and the University of Edinburgh, where he graduated with a Bachelor of Laws degree. Following graduation, Wilson qualified as a solicitor, and worked for T.F. Reid Solicitors in Paisley from 1963 until his election as an MP in 1974.

Political career
Wilson joined the Scottish National Party in 1959, on his graduation from university. He was "controller" of the political pirate radio station Radio Free Scotland, which broadcast on a frequency used by BBC between 1956 and 1965, moving the location of the transmitter to avoid being caught. Wilson served as Assistant National Secretary of the SNP from 1963 to 1964, as National Secretary from 1964 to 1971, and was vice-chairman of the SNP Oil Campaign Committee, which was responsible for the party's iconic It's Scotland's oil campaign. It was Wilson who coined the slogan.

Wilson was Executive Vice-Chairman in 1972–1973, and while Executive Vice-Chairman he had a responsibility for oil. Wilson stood as the SNP parliamentary candidate at the Dundee East by-election in March 1973, where he was narrowly defeated by Labour's George Machin. He did however clearly out-poll the Lord Provost of Dundee, William Fitzgerald, who stood as a Conservative and was thought to have had a good chance of winning the seat. Machin was a native of Sheffield and some thought Labour made a mistake by selecting an Englishman for a Scottish seat. Anti-English feeling was reported to be shown during Machin's victory speech which was reportedly disrupted by 'angry shouts of Scottish Nationalist supporters', with 'chants of "Go back to Yorkshire" and "Go home, Englishman"'. Wilson was reported to be disappointed by losing narrowly, but was pleased by the considerable increase in the SNP vote since the last general election.

Gordon Wilson was elected as Member of Parliament for the Dundee East constituency at the February 1974 general election, and increased his majority to 6,983 at the October 1974 general election. He was the deputy leader of the SNP parliamentary group at Westminster from 1974 to 1979, and served as parliamentary spokesperson on oil and energy (1974–1983) and joint spokesperson on devolution (1976–1979).

He was one of only two SNP MPs in the aftermath of the 1979 UK general election. Anthony Finlay, writing in The Glasgow Herald opined that Wilson held his seat "only because the Labour Party was foolish enough to pick Jimmy Reid" as his opponent. On 15 September 1979, at the SNP Annual National Conference in Dundee, Wilson was elected as National Convener (leader) of the SNP, succeeding Billy Wolfe. He had with 530 votes, defeating Stephen Maxwell (117 votes) and Willie McRae (52 votes).

When Robin Cook MP moved an amendment to legalise homosexual acts to the Bill which became the Criminal Justice (Scotland) Act 1980, he stated "The clause bears the names of hon. Members from all three major parties. I regret that the only party represented among Scottish Members of Parliament from which there has been no support for the clause is the Scottish National Party. I am pleased to see both representatives of that party in their place, and I hope to convert them in the remainder of my remarks." When the amendment came to a vote, Wilson and the SNP's other MP Donald Stewart both voted against the decriminalisation of homosexual acts.

In the early 1980s when the party was in internal turmoil, and he was a key mover in condemning both Siol nan Gaidheal and the 79 Group. At the SNP's conference in Ayr in June 1982 he announced in the middle of his keynote speech that there would not be "parties within the party". Using his executive position he was able to force an emergency motion and a vote on his proposal. He received the backing he needed.

Wilson led the party through two poor general election performances in 1983 and 1987. In 1987, Wilson lost his seat to Labour's John McAllion. After his defeat at the 1987 general election he returned to legal practice.

He remained as party leader, and Jim Sillars won at the Govan by-election victory in 1988. Wilson attempted to involve the SNP in the Scottish Constitutional Convention but due to the convention's unwillingness to contemplate discussions about Scottish independence as a constitutional option the SNP did not get involved. He announced his resignation as leader of the SNP in May 1990, with Alex Salmond succeeding him.

In September 1998 he was selected by delegates at the SNP's conference as a candidate for Scotland in the 1999 European Parliament elections. He was placed fourth on the SNP's list and with the SNP only winning two of the eight seats, he was unsuccessful.

He wrote three books that were published between 2009 and 2014 which detailed aspects of his political life.

Wilson continued to have a modest presence in Scottish politics after his retirement. He was active in the Scottish independence referendum campaign. In November 2012, he and Sillars suggested that Scotland should consider joining the European Free Trade Association as an alternative to remaining in the EU, and voted Leave in the 2016 United Kingdom European Union membership referendum. Together with Sillars he then established think-tank Options for Scotland, publishing articles and papers.

Personal life
Wilson married Edith (née Hassall) in 1965 and they had two daughters; Margaret and Katie, and five grandchildren.

Wilson was a devout Christian. Later in life, he was a member of Saint Peter's Free Church in Dundee. In 2010, Wilson and David Robertson co-founded Solas (Centre for Public Christianity) - an evangelical Christian body dedicated to the revival of the faith in Scotland and abroad.

He had retired to Broughty Ferry, Dundee and sailed his boat Saorsa on the Firth of Tay.

Wilson died in the Roxburghe House hospice in Dundee on the morning of 25 June 2017, after a short illness. His funeral was held at Saint Peter's Free Church in Dundee on 5 July 2017. His party colleague John Swinney and Rev Robertson gave eulogies.

Awards and honours
He was awarded an honorary Doctor of Laws (LL.D) degree by the University of Dundee in 1986.

Wilson's papers are held variously by the National Library of Scotland, Archive Services at the University of Dundee and the Scottish Political Archive at the University of Stirling. His collection of historical nationalist pamphlets is held by the Macartney Library at SNP headquarters in Edinburgh.

Publications
SNP: The Turbulent Years 1960-1990, 2009. 
Pirates of the Air: The Story of Radio Free Scotland, 2011 
Scotland: The Battle for Independence, 2014

Further reading
Scottish National Party Leaders, edited by James Mitchell and Gerry Hassan, Biteback Publications, 2016.

References

Further reading
 Thomas A. W. Stewart, "'A disguised Liberal vote'? – third-party voting and the SNP under Gordon Wilson in Dundee during the 1970s and 1980s", Contemporary British History, vol. 33, no. 3 (2019), pp. 357–382.

External links 
 

1938 births
2017 deaths
Leaders of the Scottish National Party
Alumni of the University of Edinburgh
People from Govan
Rectors of the University of Dundee
Scottish Presbyterians
Scottish National Party MPs
UK MPs 1974
UK MPs 1974–1979
UK MPs 1979–1983
UK MPs 1983–1987
Members of the Parliament of the United Kingdom for Dundee constituencies
Free Church of Scotland people